Elaine Mary Hannah Nolan (born 5 August 1981) is an Irish former cricketer who played as a right-arm medium bowler. She appeared in four One Day Internationals for Ireland between 2006 and 2008.

In December 2016, she was appointed to the role of participation director for Cricket Ireland. She was previously employed as game development manager for New Zealand Cricket.

References

External links
 
 

1981 births
Living people
Cricketers from Dublin (city)
Irish women cricketers
Ireland women One Day International cricketers